The  is a Japanese freight-only railway line in Chiba Prefecture, between Soga, Chiba and Kitasode, Sodegaura. This is the only railway line  operates, but the line has two branch lines as well. The third sector company was founded in 1962. The line mainly transports containers or petroleum for the Keiyō Industrial Zone on Port of Chiba, Tokyo Bay.

Basic data
Distance:
Soga — Kitasode: 19.9 km 
Ichihara Junction — Keiyō-Ichihara: 1.6 km 
Kitasode Junction — Keiyō-Kubota: 2.3 km 
Gauge: 1,067 mm
Stations: 10
Track: Single
Power: Diesel
Railway signalling: Simplified automatic

See also
List of railway companies in Japan
List of railway lines in Japan

References

External links
Rintetsu official website 

Railway lines in Japan
Railway lines in Chiba Prefecture